Torrance Transit is a transit agency primarily serving the South Bay region of Los Angeles County.

History 
Torrance Transit inaugurated service on January 15, 1940 using three leased 1931 Mack-33 buses. The new agency provided primarily municipal transit and maintained a bus terminal in downtown Los Angeles until 1959, when the City Council voted to discontinue bus service entirely. Mayor Albert Isen vetoed the council's action, arguing that "every first-class city has its own bus system."

Fleet 
In the early 21st century, Torrance Transit's fleet was made up of Gillig Phantom (delivered in 1992, 1996, and 1997) and Gillig Advantage (delivered in 2000 and 2002) buses. Each bus is numbered 4--. The fleet is maintained at the facilities department on Madrona Avenue, constructed in 1986.

In 2010 Torrance Transit began replacing its bus fleet with a purchase of 10 gasoline-electric hybrid New Flyer (NFI) GE40LFRs; 20 compressed natural gas (CNG)-powered NFI C40LFRs were delivered in 2011, joined by 9 more CNG NFI XN40s in 2012. The new buses were delivered with a new paint scheme which marked the start of a rebranding effort by the agency.

ZEST 
In 1993, Torrance Transit rolled out the Zero Emissions Surface Transit (ZEST) bus, a 25-seat, 29-foot coach which was the largest battery-powered transit vehicle in the United States at the time. SVMC in turn had subcontracted the assembly of ZEST to the ACL Technologies division of AAI Corporation, a defense contractor.

After several years in operation, service was trimmed back from the morning and afternoon peak commutes to just a lunchtime shuttle from employers to restaurants in order to extend its life. In an interview, John Hall with Torrance Transit stated "[The battery technology] is a long way from where it needs to be. Its useful hours [of service] are not enough. We have learned a lot making this a worthwhile investment. It has a ways to go before it gets to an everyday transit application."

Hybrids 
In 2000, Torrance Transit took delivery of two Orion VI hybrid buses equipped with Lockheed-developed HybriDrive series hybrid powertrains. One of the buses, fleet no. 401, was damaged beyond repair in a fire that occurred on September 25, 2002; nearly four years later in June 2016, Orion Bus Industries agreed to buy back the burned hulk from Torrance for $80,000. The remaining Orion VI continued to serve through at least 2010, but was dropped from the fleet by 2014.

The ten gasoline-electric hybrid New Flyer GE40LFR buses delivered in 2010 were procured as part of a joint purchase with other California transit agencies, with Montebello Bus Lines serving as the lead agency. Under the terms of the pilot program, the federal government subsidy was increased from 80% to 90% of the cost of each hybrid bus.

Routes and operations 

Torrance Transit does not operate on Thanksgiving, Christmas or New Year's Day.  Service on Memorial Day, Independence Day and Labor Day operates on Sunday schedule.

Discontinued routes

References

External links 
 Official site
 

Public transportation in Los Angeles County, California
Bus transportation in California
Transportation in Torrance, California
Transit agencies in California